This is a list of American épée fencers. (Only noted and contemporary American épée fencers are included):

Tamir Bloom
Aleina Edwards
Kelley Hurley
Weston Seth Kelsey
Maya Lawrence
Fred Linkmeyer
Michael Marx
Robert Marx
George Gabriel Masin
Cody Mattern
John Moreau
Jon Normile
Chris O'Loughlin
Arlene Stevens
Robert Ernest Stull
Soren Thompson
Benjamin Bratton
Albert Wolff

See also
Fencing
List of American sabre fencers
List of American foil fencers
USFA
USFA Hall of Fame

Fencers, epee